Foxwell is a surname. Notable people with the surname include:

Herbert Foxwell (1849–1936), English economist 
Ivan Foxwell (1914–2002), British screenwriter and film producer
Lady Edith Foxwell (1918–1996) "The Queen of London Cafe Society" and wife of Ivan
William Foxwell Albright (1891–1971) American scholar
Herbert Sydney Foxwell (1890–1943) cartoon illustrator

Fictional characters
Ffion Foxwell, a character in Black Mirror
Liam Foxwell, a character in Black Mirror

See also
Foxwells, Virginia US community